Relax Your Mind may refer to:

 Relax Your Mind, an album by Jon Mark & Alun Davies (1963)
 Relax Your Mind, an album by Jim Kweskin (1966)
 Relax Your Mind, an album by The Frantics (1968)
 Relax Your Mind, an album by Happy Traum (1975)
 Relax Your Mind, a song by Boyz II Men (2002)
 Relax Your Mind, an album by Jay Ungar & Molly Mason (2003)
 Relax Your Mind, an album by Sylvester Hillard (2009)